Benedikt Carpzov (Brandenburg, 22 October 1565 – 1624) was a German legal scholar. After studying at Frankfort and Wittenberg, and visiting other German universities, he was made doctor of law at Wittenberg in 1590. He was admitted to the faculty of law in 1592, appointed professor of institutions in 1599, and promoted to the chair Digesti infortiati et novi in 1601. In 1602 he was summoned by Sophia, widow of the elector Christian I of Saxony, to her court at Colditz, as chancellor, and was at the same time appointed councillor of the court of appeal at Dresden. After the death of the electress in 1623 he returned to Wittenberg, and died there on 26 November 1624, leaving five sons. He published a collection of writings entitled Disputationes juridicae.

Family
 Benedikt Carpzov Jr. (1595–1666), his second son, like him was a great lawyer.
 August Carpzov (1612–1683), his fifth son, was a Saxon diplomat.

References 

1565 births
1624 deaths
16th-century German jurists
17th-century German jurists